The Pollard-Nelson House is a historic home in Logansport, Cass County, Indiana. It was built in 1845 and enlarged in 1889 and 1910.  It is a two-story, seven bay, Greek Revival style brick dwelling with flanking two-story wings and rear additions.  It has a gable roof and features a two-story, projecting front portico supported by Doric order columns.

It was listed on the National Register of Historic Places in 1975.

References

Houses on the National Register of Historic Places in Indiana
Greek Revival houses in Indiana
Houses completed in 1845
Houses in Cass County, Indiana
National Register of Historic Places in Cass County, Indiana
Logansport, Indiana